Heavy Metal Thunder may refer to:

Heavy Metal Thunder (Saxon album), by the British band Saxon
Heavy Metal Thunder (Sex Machineguns album), by the Japanese band Sex Machineguns
Heavy Metal Thunder (video game), by the Japanese company Square Enix
"Born to Be Wild", a 1968 song by Steppenwolf, the lyrics contain the line "I like smoke and lightning, Heavy Metal Thunder"